Treaty of Fort Wayne may refer to either of two treaties between the United States and Native American tribes signed at Fort Wayne in Indiana.

 Treaty of  Fort Wayne (1803), with the Delaware, Shawnee, Potowatomi, Miami, Eel River Miami, Kickapoo, Wea, Piankashaws, and Kaskaskias
 Treaty of Fort Wayne (1809), with the Delaware, Potowatomi, Miami, and Eel River Miami